Downtown Aurora Historic District is a national historic district located at Aurora, Dearborn County, Indiana.  The district encompasses 272 contributing buildings, 1 contributing site, and 3 contributing structures in the central business district of Aurora. The district developed between about 1830 and 1944, and includes notable examples of Italianate, Federal, and Greek Revival style architecture.  Located in the district are the separately listed Aurora City Hall, Aurora Methodist Episcopal Church, Aurora Public Library, First Evangelical United Church of Christ, First Presbyterian Church, George Street Bridge, Hillforest (Forest Hill), Lewis Hurlbert, Sr. House, Leive, Parks and Stapp Opera House, and George Sutton Medical Office.  Other notable buildings include the T. and J.W. Gaff Distillery (1843), First National Bank (1924), I.O.O.F. Hall (1887), B&O Railroad Station (1911-1917), John Neff Building, Chamber Stevens & Co. Dry Goods Store, U.S. Post Office (1935), Star Milling Co. (1891), and St. John's Evangelical Lutheran Church (1874).

It was added to the National Register of Historic Places in 1994.

References

External links

Historic districts on the National Register of Historic Places in Indiana
Italianate architecture in Indiana
Federal architecture in Indiana
Greek Revival architecture in Indiana
Historic districts in Dearborn County, Indiana
National Register of Historic Places in Dearborn County, Indiana